Tearney is a surname. Notable people with the surname include:

Carlos Tearney, American martial artist
Finn Tearney (born 1990), New Zealand tennis player
Guillermo J. Tearney (born 1966), American pathologist

See also
Kearney (surname)
Tierney